The Macropodiformes , also known as macropods, are one of the three suborders of the large marsupial order Diprotodontia. They may in fact be nested within one of the  suborders, Phalangeriformes. Kangaroos, wallabies and allies, bettongs, potoroos and rat kangaroos are all members of this suborder.

Classification 

 Superfamily Macropodoidea
Family †Balbaridae: (basal quadrupedal kangaroos)
 Genus †Galanarla
 Genus †Nambaroo
 Genus †Wururoo
 Genus †Ganawamaya
 Genus †Balbaroo
 Family Hypsiprymnodontidae: (musky rat-kangaroo)
 Subfamily Hypsiprymnodontinae
 Genus Hypsiprymnodon
Musky rat-kangaroo, Hypsiprymnodon moschatus 
†Hypsiprymnodon bartholomaii 
†Hypsiprymnodon philcreaseri 
†Hypsiprymnodon dennisi 
†Hypsiprymnodon karenblackae 
 Subfamily †Propleopinae
 Genus †Ekaltadeta
†Ekaltadeta ima 
†Ekaltadeta jamiemulveneyi 
 Genus †Propleopus
†Propleopus oscillans
†Propleopus chillagoensis 
†Propleopus wellingtonensis  
 Genus †Jackmahoneyi
†Jackmahoneyi toxoniensis
 Family Potoroidae: (bettongs, potoroos, and rat-kangaroos)
Genus Wakiewakie
Genus Purtia
Genus ?†Palaeopotorous
Genus †Gumardee
Genus †Milliyowi 
 Genus †Ngamaroo
 Subfamily Potoroinae
 Genus Aepyprymnus
 Rufous rat-kangaroo, Aepyprymnus rufescens
 Genus Bettongia
 Eastern bettong, Bettongia gaimardi
 Boodie, Bettongia lesueur
 Woylie, Bettongia penicillata
 Northern bettong, Bettongia tropica
 †Bettongia moyesi
 Genus †Caloprymnus
 †Desert rat-kangaroo, Caloprymnus campestris
 Genus Potorous
 Long-footed potoroo, Potorous longipes
 †Broad-faced potoroo, Potorous platyops
 Long-nosed potoroo, Potorous tridactylus
 Gilbert's potoroo, Potorous gilbertii
 Family Macropodidae: (kangaroos, wallabies and allies) 
 Genus †Wabularoo
 Genus †Bulungamaya
 Genus Ganguroo
 Genus Cookeroo
 Genus †Watutia
 Subfamily Lagostrophinae
 Genus Lagostrophus
 Banded hare-wallaby, Lagostrophus fasciatus
 Genus †Troposodon
 Subfamily Sthenurinae
 Genus †Wanburoo
 Genus †Rhizosthenurus
 Genus Hadronomas
 Tribe Sthenurini
 Genus †Sthenurus
 Genus Eosthenurus
 Genus Metasthenurus
 Tribe Simosthenurini
 Genus Archaeosimos
 Genus Simosthenurus
 Genus †Procoptodon
 Subfamily Macropodinae
 Genus †Dorcopsoides
 Genus †Kurrabi
 Genus †Prionotemnus
 Genus †Congruus
 Genus Protemnodon
 Genus †Baringa
 Genus †Bohra
 Genus †Synaptodon
 Genus †Fissuridon
 Genus †Silvaroo
 Genus Dendrolagus: tree-kangaroos
 Genus Dorcopsis: forest wallabies
 Genus Dorcopsulus
 Genus Lagorchestes: hare-wallabies
 Genus Macropus
 Genus Onychogalea
 Genus Petrogale: rock-wallabies
 Genus Setonix
 Genus Thylogale
 Genus Wallabia

References 

Diprotodonts
Extant Chattian first appearances